Valeri Hristov (Bulgarian: Валери Христов; born 10 March 1998) is a Bulgarian professional footballer who plays as a defender for Etar Veliko Tarnovo.

References

External links

1998 births
Living people
Bulgarian footballers
First Professional Football League (Bulgaria) players
Second Professional Football League (Bulgaria) players
FC Chernomorets Balchik players
FC Montana players
Association football defenders
Sportspeople from Varna, Bulgaria